The 1924 United States Senate election in Illinois took place on November 4, 1924.

Incumbent Republican Medill McCormick was unseated in the Republican primary by Charles S. Deneen, who went on to win the general election.

Election information
The primaries and general election coincided with those for other federal elections (president and House) and those for state elections. The primaries were held April 8, 1924.

This was the first election for this U.S. Senate seat to be held after the Nineteenth Amendment to the United States Constitution granted women suffrage.

Democratic primary

Candidates
William McKinley, former speaker of the Illinois House of Representatives (not to be confused with the William B. McKinley that, at the time, occupied the other Illinois U.S. Senate seat)
Albert A. Sprague, chairman of Consolidated Grocers Corporation, and member of the John Crerar Library board

Results

Republican primary

Candidates
Charles S. Deneen, former governor of Illinois
Newton Jenkins, lawyer and candidate for 27th Ward Chicago alderman in 1920
Medill McCormick, incumbent U.S. senator
Adelbert McPherson
Gilbert Gile Ogden

Results
Deneen won by a mere 0.69% margin of just 5,944 votes.

Socialist primary

Candidates
George Koop, perennial candidate

Results

General election

Candidates
Charles S. Deneen (Republican), former governor of Illinois
J. Louis Engdahl (Workers), journalist and newspaper editor
George Koop (Socialist), perennial candidate
Parke Longworth (independent)
Lewis D. Spaulding (Commonwealth Land)
Albert A. Sprague (Democratic), chairman of Consolidated Grocers Corporation, and member of the John Crerar Library board
Albert Wirth (Socialist Labor)

Results

Aftermath
On February 25, 1925, as he was preparing to leave office, McCormick died in what is considered to have been a suicide (though the suicidal nature of his death was not known to the public, contemporarily). His reelection loss is believed to have contributed to his suicide. McCormick's widow Ruth Hanna McCormick would go on to defeat Deneen in the 1930 Republican primary.

See also
1924 United States Senate elections

References

1924
Illinois
United States Senate